Oberleutnant Franz Rudorfer (1897-1919) was an Austro-Hungarian World War I flying ace credited with eleven confirmed and two unconfirmed aerial victories.

Early life
Franz Rudorfer was born on 29 July 1897 in Vienna, Austria, when it was still part of the Austro-Hungarian Empire.

World War I
Rudorfer had volunteered for service before World War I began.  He was posted to Infanterieregiment No. 59 as a new leutnant in August 1916. In May 1917, he requested transfer to aviation. His first posting after observer training at Wiener-Neustadt was Flik 19J on the Italian front, under the command of Adolf Heyrowsky. Here he scored his first victory, becoming a balloon buster on 15 November 1917. It was also during his Flik 19J assignment that Rudorfer began to teach himself to fly. He would become a pilot without undergoing formal training.

In April 1918, he was posted to Flik 51J to fly Albatros D.III fighters. Between 17 April and 27 October 1918, he reeled off confirmed victories over eight enemy airplanes and two more observation balloons, along with two unconfirmed. During the crucial Battle of Vittorio Veneto, Rudorfer was one of the few Austro-Hungarians flying, bringing down a balloon on 24 October, and a couple of Sopwith Camels on the 27th. He would score no more victories before the war ended on 11 November 1918.

Postwar career
On 30 December 1918, Franz Rudorfer received Austrian Pilot's Certificate No. 2647.

Franz Rudorfer died of unknown causes on 13 November 1919.

Notes
 Flik = Fliegerkompanie, a basic Air Force unit of Squadron size though was often understaffed numbering on average 8 pilots. 
 Flik with'J' = 'J' denoted Jagdfliegerkompanie which was composed of dedicated Fighter aircraft.
 Flik with 'F' = 'F' Fernaufklärerkompanie was the designation for a Long Range Reconnaissance unit such as Flik 47F.

Sources of information

References

 Герої українського неба - пілоти визвольної війни 1917-1920 рр. Ярослав Тинченко. Темпора, 2010. .

1897 births
1919 deaths
Austro-Hungarian World War I flying aces